The Women's World Chess Championship 2004 took place from May 21 to June 4, 2004 in Elista, Russia.  It was won by Antoaneta Stefanova, who beat Ekaterina Kovalevskaya in the final by 2½ to ½.

For the third time, the championship  took the form of a 64-player knock-out tournament.

Participants
Qualified players were seeded by their Elo ratings (on the April 2004 list).

Notable top players not taking part was Judit Polgár (ranked the no. 1 woman in the world - and 9th overall), Xie Jun (ranked 2nd), Zhu Chen (8th), Qin Kanying (14th), Inna Gaponenko (18th) and Sofia Polgar (19th).

Notably, this was the second Women's World Championship in a row in which the reigning champion (in this case Zhu Chen) did not attempt to defend their title.

Qualification paths 

WC: Runner-up and semifinalists of Women's World Chess Championship 2001 (3)
J: World Junior Champion 2002
R: Rating (average rating of July 2002 and January 2003 rating list was used) (6)
E: European Individual Championships 2002 and 2003 (29)
AM: American Continental Chess Championship 2003 

AS: Asian Chess Championship 2003 (3)
AF: African Chess Championship 2003 (3)
Z2.1 (3), Z2.2, Z2.3, Z2.4, Z2.5, Z3.1, Z3.2, Z3.3 (2), Z3.5 (4), Z3.6: Zonal tournaments
PN: FIDE President nominee (2)

Results

Final Match
No fourth game was played, as Stefanova led with two points.
{| class="wikitable" style="text-align:center"
|+Women's World Chess Championship Final 2004
|-
! !! 1 !! 2 !! 3 !! 4 !! Total
|-
| align=left | 
| 0 ||style="background:black; color:white"| 0 || ½  || rowspan=2|—|| ½
|-
| align=left | 
| style="background:black; color:white"| 1 || 1 ||style="background:black; color:white"| ½ || 2½
|}

Bracket

References

External links

Regulations for the 2003-2004 Women's World Chess Championship FIDE
Reports by ChessBase

2004 in chess
Women's World Chess Championships
Chess Championship
Chess in Russia
2004 in Russia